Anchorage 5th Avenue Mall is a  regional shopping mall located in Downtown Anchorage, Alaska, United States. It has five levels with the only JCPenney store in Alaska as its sole anchor. It also boasts Alaska's only Victoria's Secret, Apple Store, Coach, and Michael Kors locations, The website describes it as a “distinctive, five level shopping center surrounded by the buzz of Anchorage’s downtown core.” There was also a Nordstrom as a second anchor store until it closed in September 2019.

The mall is owned by Northwestern Simon Inc. and is administered by the Simon Property Group.

History

The mall opened in 1987, covering a city block previously occupied mostly by small, two-story commercial buildings and parking lots.  The original developers were JCPenney and The Rainier Fund. As the mall opened during an economic slowdown in Alaska, its occupancy rate hovered in the 20 to 30 percent range for most of its early years. It was later sold to Northwestern Simon Inc. in 1994, and it has been operated by Simon Property Group ever since. On June 26, 2019, it was announced that Nordstrom would be closing on September 13, 2019. 

The mall was closed for 2 weeks in March, 2020 as part of an attempt to curb the spread of the COVID-19.

Facilities

Interior

Compared to other malls in Alaska, The 5th Avenue Mall integrates many more aesthetic designs inside its buildings. Some examples are the sky-lit roof above the main "Arcade", and features galleria-style wide, open spaces. The top floor of the Arcade is exclusively a food court. Most of the mall's elevators have glass panels, and are decorated with neon lights. The mall uses skybridges to provide indoor access between buildings and parking, contributing to the streetscapes of 5th and 6th Avenues. The ground floor of the galleria functions as an indoor pedestrian extension of "D" Street.

Parking
There is significant parking available at the mall, which is owned and operated by ACDA via EasyPark. The 5th Avenue Parking garage is one of the largest parking garages Downtown, offering six levels of parking. The JCPenney parking garage, recently under renovation, offers additional parking Downtown and the first hour is free to park in that garage.

List of anchor stores

References

1987 establishments in Alaska
Buildings and structures in Anchorage, Alaska
Economy of Anchorage, Alaska
Shopping malls in Alaska
Shopping malls established in 1987
Simon Property Group
Tourist attractions in Anchorage, Alaska